K. G. Sankara Pillai (born 1948) is an Indian poet. He came into prominence in the 1970s with the publication of the poem "Bengal" and is now one of the most popular among the modernist poets of Kerala. A recipient of the state and central Sahitya Akademi Awards in 1998 and 2002 respectively, his writings in Malayalam have been translated into many Indian languages, as well as Chinese, French, German, English and Sinhala.

He has been a teacher of literature, starting as a lecturer in 1971 and retiring in 2002 from the post of Principal of Maharaja's College, Ernakulam. He is also an accomplished translator, publishing in Malayalam translations of poetry from different parts of the world. He has also been the editor of several important literary journals, such as Prasakthi and  Samakaleena Kavitha. He has published a collection of writings on different aspects of theatre, titled Samvidhayaka Sankalpam.

Closely associated with the human rights and civil rights movements in Kerala, Pillai was the Chairperson of Jananeethi, a human rights organisation.

Major works
 Kochiyile Vrikshangal (Mulberry, Kozhikode, 1994)
 K. G. Sankara Pillayude Kavithakal 1969-1996 (DC Books, Kottayam, 1997)
 KGS Kavithakal 1997-2007 (DC Books, Kottayam, 2008)
 Samvidhayaka Sankalpam (Kerala Sahitya Akademi, Thrissur, 2010)

Awards
 1998: Kerala Sahitya Akademi Award for K. G. Sankara Pillayude Kavithakal 1969-1996
 2002: Kendra Sahitya Akademi Award for K. G. Sankara Pillayude Kavithakal 1969-1996
 2008: P. Kunhiraman Nair Award
 2009: Odakkuzhal Award
 2009: Habeeb Valappad Award
 2011: Pandalam Kerala Varma Poetry Award for KGS Kavithakal 1997-2007
 2018: Kerala Sahitya Akademi Fellowship
 2020: Kadammanitta Ramakrishnan Award

References

External links
 Profile of K. G. Sankara Pillai

1948 births
Living people
Recipients of the Gangadhar National Award
Recipients of the Sahitya Akademi Award in Malayalam
Recipients of the Kerala Sahitya Akademi Award
Academic staff of Maharaja's College, Ernakulam
Indian male poets
Malayali people
Poets from Kerala
Malayalam-language writers
Malayalam poets
20th-century Indian poets
20th-century Indian male writers